Funky Cops is an animated series about two cops in San Francisco during the 1970s. The show was created by brothers Christophe and Benoit Di
Sabatino and produced by Antefilms.

In the US, it was licensed by 4Kids Entertainment and aired on the Fox Box (later renamed 4Kids TV), but this now-rare version was short-lived. It also appeared on Kabillion On Demand on some services, most commonly Charter; as well as on the official Funky Cops YouTube channel.

Plot

Ace Anderson and Dick Kowalski ("Jack Kowalski" in the 4Kids version) are two semi-competent cops in San Francisco during the late 1970s. They show more attention towards appearing cool and disco dancing, but finish the cases by the end of the day. They are assisted by their disgruntled police chief Captain Dobbs, plucky reporter Miss Lee, fellow disco lover Boogaloo, and an additional officer called Flora "Fly" Ibanez in the second season.

Cast 

Additional voices (French): Jean-Claude Donda, Serge Faliu, Patrick Guillemin, Claire Guyot, Nathalie Spitzer

Additional voices (English, 4Kids): Greg Abbey, Maddie Blaustein, J. David Brimmer, James Cathcart, Kathleen Delaney, Darren Dunstan, Matthew George, Wayne Grayson, Dan Green, Damian Hill, Megan Hollingshead, Dillon James, Tara Jayne-Sands, Ted Lewis, Brian Wilson,Karen Neill, Andrew Paull, Kayzie Rogers, Sean Schemmel, Veronica Taylor, Tony Von Horne, Mike Pollock

Additional voices (English, Elude): Paul Bandey, Guillaume Barrière, Stephen Croce, Christine Flowers, Matthew Géczy, Mike Marshall, Douglas Rand, Barbara-Anne Weber-Scaff, Jesse Joe Walsh, Dana Westberg

Episodes

Season 1

Season 2

References

External links 
 

2002 French television series debuts
2004 French television series endings
2000s American animated television series
2003 American television series debuts
2004 American television series endings
2000s American police comedy television series
Fox Broadcasting Company original programming
Jetix original programming
Disney XD original programming
American children's animated comedy television series
French children's animated comedy television series
2000s French animated television series
Television series set in the 1970s
Television shows set in San Francisco
Action comedy television series